Hidden or The Hidden may refer to:

Film and television

Film
 The Hidden (1987 film), an American science fiction/horror film
 Hidden (2005 film) or Caché, a French thriller film
 The Hidden (2005 film), a Spanish-British-Italian psychological thriller film
 Hidden (2009 film), a Norwegian horror film
 Hidden 3D, a 2011 Italian-Canadian horror film
 Hidden (2015 film), an American psychological thriller film

Television
 Hidden (2011 TV series), a British political drama series
 Hidden (2018 TV series), a Welsh/English bilingual police drama series
 "Hidden" (The 4400), an episode
 "Hidden" (Smallville), an episode
 "The Hidden" (The Penguins of Madagascar), an episode

Literature
 Hidden (Torchwood), a 2008 audiobook based on the TV series Torchwood
 Hidden, a 2012 House of Night novel by P. C. Cast and Kristin Cast
 The Hidden (novel), a 2000 Animorphs novel
 The Hidden, a 2004 novel by Sarah Pinborough

Music
 Hidden (Coma Virus album), 1996
 Hidden (These New Puritans album), 2010
 Hidden (Titiyo album), 2008

People
 Anthony Hidden (1936–2016), British judge
 Genevieve Hidden (1926–2016), French surgeon
 George Hidden, English MP for Great Bedwyn in 1558
 L'Encobert (died 1522), or "The Hidden", Spanish rebel leader in the Revolt of the Brotherhoods in Valencia

Other uses
 The Hidden (video game), a 2005 multiplayer mod for the computer game Half Life 2
 Hidden Report, Anthony Hidden's 1989 report on the 1988 Clapham Junction rail crash
 Amun, meaning "The Hidden", an Ancient Egyptian deity

See also